The Apostolic-Prophetic Movement (AP movement) is a Christian movement that believes that they are restoring elements of what they call the Five-Fold Ministry. This movement is rooted in the Charismatic movement, and is seen in Charismatic, Pentecostal, and Third-Wave experience. Prophecy is a major part of the group.

Creeds 
This movement is wide and varied, while some only hold to one of the Three Ecumenical Creeds and the Nicene Creed as authoritative and part of what they call "historical Christianity." Others such as the International House of Prayer of Kansas City (IHOPKC) hold to the Apostolic Creed, Nicene Creed and Athanasian Creed.

Purpose 
The stated purpose of the AP Movement is to restore the ministries of prophets and apostles to the church. They believe the restoration of these five ministry gifts were for fulfilling the purpose for which they were given: the equipping and perfecting of the saints in Christ's image and ministry. Prophets and apostles are preparing the saints for their full day of manifesting the Kingdom of God for a witness to every nation.

History
The movement began in the United States but it quickly spread courtesy of early mass-marketing techniques currently used by megachurches and religious corporations today. In the AP movement, Paul Cain demonstrated the function of the office of the prophet. Bill Hamon was the first to introduce the idea of a Prophetic Movement coming and was instrumental in birthing and pioneering the restoration of prophets, especially in the form of the Elijah company of prophets and activating and training the saints in prophetic ministry. John Eckhardt and C. Peter Wagner were prominent figures in pioneering and propagating the Apostolic Movement. After the restoration of apostles began to be propagated, many apostles began coming forth throughout the United States and many nations of the world.

The majority of the people who participated and the ministers who preached in the AP Movement came from the former Charismatic Movement churches. The ministry was the preaching of the Word of God, accompanied by personal prophecy, to individuals. Hundreds of prophets went to numerous nations and prophesied to national leaders. The apostles began manifesting the ministry of the apostle with signs and wonders. The saints were taught and activated in divine healing and the working of miracles. Apostolic order for the local church and corporate Body of Christ began to be established, based on the Five-Fold Ministry as described in Ephesians 4. Apostolic church planting was implemented and the true apostles and prophets began to work for the unity of the Church, the restoration of all things, and the promotion of the Kingdom of God.

Pioneers
Bill Hamon and C. Peter Wagner worked together in propagating the Apostolic Movement, similar to how Martin Luther and John Calvin worked together in propagating the Protestant Movement. Hamon had the original vision for the restoration of apostles, but Wagner was the theologian who began to write and give designations for the different types of apostles and their various functions in the body of Christ. The movement was called the New Apostolic Reformation (NAR) which was growing at a rate of nine million people per year. These apostolic churches are the only segment of churches that is growing faster than Islam, or another religion. According to one source, the coalition includes several hundred apostles, across the US and about 40 countries, international training centres, and prayer warriors' communication networks in the 50 states and worldwide. C. Peter Wagner, former professor of Church Growth at Fuller Theological Seminary of World Mission, founder of Global Harvest Ministries and presiding apostle and founder of the International Coalition of Apostles, and cofounder of World Prayer Center, played a pivotal role as the leading apostle of the movement from the 1980s to the 2000s.

Seven Mountains Mandate
The 5-fold ministry was initially restored and applied to the religion mountain, whereby five-fold ministers were seen to emerge to equip and raise up the saints. However, it is now being restored and becoming more prevalent across the various spectrums of society as well, under the Seven Mountains Mandate. The goal is then to see righteous, God-fearing people being raised up and functioning effectively across society, beyond the four walls of the church building, who can bring about a manifestation of the Kingdom of Heaven on earth. The promotion of these seven mandates is done by marketplace apostles such as Os Hillman and Lance Wallnau, who speak extensively across Africa, Asia, South America, and Europe. Speaking on Patricia King's Extreme Prophetic TV broadcast, Lance Wallnau said: "the Seven Mountains are almost a template for spiritual warfare because the church so frequently does not have a language for how it goes about taking territory."

In Apostle Bill Hamon's 2010 book Prophetic Scriptures Yet to Be Fulfilled, he describes the fascinating transformation of the seven mountains of culture, and how every nation will become either a sheep or a goat nation. In the end, the restoration of all things spoken of by the apostles and prophets will supposedly release Jesus to return and set up His domain over all the earth, as written in the New Testament of the Bible in Acts 3.

In effect, the Church is working to be restored to the same power, energy, and fullness of faith as that of the Early Church. As more teachers, prophets, and apostles are restored to the body of Christ, the movement is gravitating towards apostolic centres being established in various cities, and nations to become a catalyst for the work of transformation globally. In the New Apostolic Reformation, Apostolic Centers are being restored as training centres for equipping and activating the saints (believers) so that they are well-equipped for ministry and the works of transformation across the seven mountains of society. These apostolic centres are not pastoral churches, nor are they denominational institutions, but are regarded as being part of a marketplace ministry that is led and governed by the local five-fold ministers. The goal is then to achieve sociologically verifiable transformation of cities (and nations), which is based on standard social scientific measuring equipment, verified by independent professional sociologists, as stated by C. P. Wagner in his book titled, The Church in the Workplace.

Kansas City Prophets
Some of those who shaped the current Apostolic-Prophetic Movement in the United States was based in Kansas City, Missouri and became known as the "Kansas City Prophets." They originated in the late 1980s and early 1990s originating from Kansas City Fellowship (KCF) whose influence eventually went international. It was overseen by the Pastor of KCF, Mike Bickle. Included in the list of prophetic people were Bob Jones, Paul Cain, Bill Hamon, Larry Randolph, James Goll, Jill Austin, and John Paul Jackson. John Wimber provided some oversight from the Vinyard during the first few years. Cain had participated in the Healing Revival initiated by William Branham during the 1950s. The surviving "Kansas City Prophets" except Mike Bickle have left Kansas City but continue to be active in ministry throughout North America; they often attend and speak at charismatic Christian conferences and meetings. A book on this subject is Some Said It Thundered which was published in 1991, and written during what is considered to be the height of their movement. A later book was written containing segments of their history called A Life and Legacy of Pat Bickle and a History of the Kansas City Prophets.

The Apostolic Roundtable
The Apostolic Roundtable was a society of 25 apostles, convened by C. Peter Wagner that included Karl A. Barden, Bob L. Beckett, W. Rice Brookes, Emanuele Cannistraci, Gregory Dickow, Michael P. Fletcher, Chuck Pierce, Ché Ahn, Harold Caballeros, Naomi Dowdy, John Eckhardt, Bill Hamon], Jim Hodges, John P. Kelly, Lawrence Kennedy, Lawrence Khong, David Kwang-Shin Kim, Larry H. Kreider, Alan Langstaff, Roberts Liardon, Dexter Low, Mel Mullen, Alistair Petrie, and Eddie Villanueva.

Definition of Apostle (In the AP Movement) 
1. Apostle as an evangelist and bishop: "An 'apostle' [is] one who is called and sent by Christ to have the spiritual authority, character, gifts, and abilities to successfully reach and establish people in Kingdom truth and order, especially through founding and overseeing local churches," according to David Cannistraci, author of two books on the Apostolic Movement and the lead pastor of Gateway City Church, a multi-site church in multiple states based in San Jose, California.

2. Apostle as a church planter: "The apostolic gift leaves churches in its wake." It is characterized by a "paternal bond between apostles and pastors."

Apostolic networks 
Apostolic networks are non-denominational alliances of independent churches and ministries. Apostolic networks of non-denominational alliances of churches and ministries are among the fastest growing movements in the modern Christian world. The following are examples of apostolic networks.

Network of Christian Ministries 
In July 1982, while guest speakers at Emanuele Cannistraci's church, Evangel Christian Fellowship, Bishop John Giminez (founder of Rock Church and Washington for Jesus), Charles Green and Mel Davis, along with Cannistraci, conceived the idea to form The Network of Christian Ministries ("The Network"). The Network was a major apostolic network formally established in 1984 in Washington D.C. By 1989, most of the national leaders in the charismatic renewal had joined The Network.

The founders of The Network were Cannistraci, Giminez, Charles Green, Paul Paino, Thomas Reid, David Schoch, Dick Iverson, Bob Weiner, and John Meares. Other prominent ministers on the Board of Governors included Kenneth Copeland, Charles Simpson, Ken Sumrall, Mel Davis, Charles Blair, and Roderick Caesar, Sr.The twelve "national leaders" and "apostles" of the Apostolic Presbytery were from all "streams" of the full gospel charismatic movement who truly represent the nation. The twelve apostles included Emanuele Cannistraci, Dick Benjamin, Charles Green, Paul Paino, Roderick Caesar, Sr., John Hagee, Dick Iverson], Charles Simpson, John Casteel, Houston Miles, and Ken Sumrall. The "apostolic fathers" met as a larger "congress of elders" and board of governors "to address issues confronting the church and society." The apostles were recognized as "national leaders" that were truly representative of the myriad of Christian fellowships across the country.

The Network started a national movement that united leaders from diverse fellowships, denominations, and ministries across the nation. Thousands of ministers across the US were invited to be part of The Network. The purpose of The Network was to unify and strengthen the Church. The Constitution also included the power to establish churches, missions, schools, colleges, and hospitals, to train chaplains for government and military service, and to set up an affiliated political action organization. The unity movement spread internationally as ministers in other countries joined The Network.

At the 1989 convention in Anaheim, there was a collective appeal from younger ministers for mentorship to pass on the elders' "reservoir of knowledge", "giftings", and "legacy" to the "next generation of world changers". The Network ultimately disbanded as it was unable to adapt to the appeal for mentorship.

 Other networks 
 The Antioch Network of Churches and Ministries. (Evangel Christian Fellowship, San Jose, CA)
Antioch Churches & Ministries (helped establish churches in 46 nations). Emanuele Cannistraci "patriarchal" apostle. John P. Kelly original "overseeing" apostle. Exemplifies how apostolic teams resolve issues in contrast to denominational structuresApostolic Missions International (Emanuele Cannistraci, 'fathering apostle). Apostolic Leadership SummitThe International Fellowship of Faith Ministries (2000 churches) 
International Convention of Faith Churches & Ministries (495 churches; headquarters in Tulsa) 
Faith Christian Fellowship International (1,000 ordained ministers) 
National Leadership Conference, Jim Jackson (represents other networks) 
Fellowship of Christian Assemblies (101 churches)''
Harvest International Ministries (HIM) (25,000 affiliated ministries and organizations in over 65 nations)
Wagner University (training revivalists in apostolic and prophetic ministry)

References

Charismatic and Pentecostal Christianity